Orko was a thunder god in ancient Basque mythology. The name is derived from Orkeguna, the Basque word for Thursday.

References

Basque gods
Thunder gods
Basque mythology